In Greek mythology, Phyllis (Φύλλις) was the god of the homonymous river in Bithynia. By a local meadow nymph, he became father of a son Dipsacus, who led a pastoral lifestyle by his father's river and was remembered for having been hospitable to Phrixus on the latter's way to Colchis.

Sources
Apollonius Rhodius, Argonautica, 2. 652 - 657 with scholia on 652 - 653

Potamoi
Greek mythology of Anatolia